"The Wife" is the 81st episode of the NBC sitcom Seinfeld. The 17th episode of the fifth season, it was originally broadcast on March 17, 1994. In this episode, Jerry and his girlfriend pretend to be husband and wife, and George is spotted urinating in the shower at the health club, leaving Elaine caught in the middle as the man she is attracted to threatens to report George. Jerry's quasi-wife was played by Courteney Cox, just prior to Cox's breakthrough as a star. For the syndicated repeats, this episode is just one of a few this season to keep Jerry's opening stand-up routine intact.

Plot
Jerry and his girlfriend Meryl pose as husband and wife so that she can receive a 25% off family discount on dry cleaning. Elaine is attracted to Greg, a man at the health club, but is confused by his mixed signals, such as giving her an open lipped kiss but also wiping off her water bottle when she gives him a drink. Meanwhile, Kramer is losing sleep because Jerry took his favorite quilt to the cleaner, so that he could get the family discount too.

Jerry and Meryl enjoy pretending to be married, keeping up the act even when they are alone. They start to bicker and promptly make up afterwards as if they really were a long time married couple. Eventually he "cheats" on Meryl by taking another woman's laundry to the cleaners. Meryl finds out when she picks up their dry cleaning and sees unfamiliar lingerie mixed in. She confronts Jerry, who tells her he wants a "divorce" so that the other woman can pretend to be his wife and get the discount. Jerry and Meryl amicably break up.

Greg observes George urinating in the shower at the health club. He tells Elaine he intends to report George chiefly as an excuse to talk to the manager, whom he is acutely interested in. After realizing Greg was uninterested in her all along, Elaine then helps George by threatening to report Greg for not wiping off his sweat from the machines.

Elaine points out that Kramer is looking pale from lack of sleep, so Kramer goes to a tanning salon because he is going to meet with the parents of his girlfriend Anna. He falls asleep on the tanning bed and becomes very dark. When Kramer arrives to meet Anna's African-American family, they are horrified, thinking he is in blackface.

Production
After filming, the producers belatedly decided that they wanted the character of Paula to be more exotic, so they hired a voice actress to dub over all of Rebecca Glenn's speech, reciting all the same dialogue in a French accent.

References

External links 

Seinfeld (season 5) episodes
1994 American television episodes